Gary Marlowe (born March 7, 1967 in Berlin) is a German musician, composer and music producer.

Life 
Marlowe began playing piano at four. He started as a professional musician in the 1980s, as a session keyboardist, and soon became a producer. He studied Composition for Film with the Academy Award winners Luis Bacalov and Nicola Piovani at the Accademia Musicale Chigiana in Siena, Italy. He is currently working in Bavaria and Berlin, also in Italy and Los Angeles.

Musician, composer and producer 
Marlowe is a multi-instrumentalist, playing piano, keyboards, synthesizers, organ, guitar, drums, bass, buzuk, saz, oud, ethnic flutes and percussion. He also is a lead singer. He works primarily for movies, television and commercials.

Marlowe´s credits include many record releases, among them a No. 1 hit single and various Top Ten chart entries. He worked with artists including Motörhead producer Guy Bidmead, Ten Years After, Rage, Coroner, Rasca Cocous (with Seeed producer Olsen Involtini), Jam&Spoon, and also comedians Diether Krebs, Dieter Hallervorden and Frank Zander. His more recent collaborations include the Orchestra Sinfonica di Trieste, cello soloist Tiziana Gasparoni, Fulvio Zafret, Ben Mono, Cecil Remmler, Laura Bee,  Alessandro de Crescenzo (Gianna Nannini) and singer Sofi de la Torre. Together with Nine Inch Nails and Moby, Marlowe worked on a UNESCO web series in 2012.

In October 2013, Marlowe was chosen as one of the top 40 international film composers, to perform with the Brussels Philharmonic Orchestra  for the 40th anniversary of the Gent Film Festival. He performed his piece "el palmar", written for the occasion, playing live guitar with the orchestra, conducted by Dirk Brossé.

He owns a recording studio, ULTRA | VIOLET recording, in Schleching, in the Bavarian/Austrian Alps, near Kitzbühel and Salzburg, and has partner studios in Berlin. Recent productions featuring instrumental performances by Marlowe include Sofi de la Torre, punk band WIZO, and a Tears for Fears remix.

In 2018, Gary Marlowe officially received the title Steinway Artist.

Marlowe is lecturing as a docent in various academies, such as the SAE School of Audio Engineering. He is a Berlinale Talent Alumnus, a member of the World Soundtrack Academy, and the European Film Academy.

Installations 
Marlowe developed his concept of aural frames, ambient music installations for indoor and outdoor spaces, in collaboration with painters, sculptors and video artists. Those were exhibited also by the Biennale di Venezia (music for a Richard Nonas exhibition) and Scatola Bianca ("requiem | repeat", personal exhibition in collaboration with Gianni Moretti).

Work and filmography 
 2018 
Planeta 5000 (dir. Carlos Val)
Tatort: Für immer und Dich (dir. Julia von Heinz)
Pete's Last Dance (dir. Benjamin Teske)
 2017
The Milk System / Das System Milch (dir. Andreas Pichler)
WINNER 11th International Fünf Seen Film Festival
When Paul came over the Sea (dir. Jakob Preuss)
WINNER 20th Shanghai International Film Festival
NOMINATION BEST FILM MUSIC 38th Max Ophüls Preis Festival
NOMINATION BEST FILM MUSIC, 6th GERMAN DOCUMENTARY FILM MUSIC AWARDS 2018
 2016
Strawberry Bubblegums.
. Winner 37th Max Ophüls Preis.
Sex & Crime.
Treffen sich zwei.
 2015
Winnetous Sohn. Winner 31st Warsaw Film Festival.
Escape. Jerry Goldsmith Awards 2015 finalist.
 2014 
. Grimme Preis 2015.
Mordsfreunde, Jerry Goldsmith Awards 2014 finalist.
 2013 
concert with The Brussels Philharmonic Orchestra in Gent, Belgium.
The Old, the Young and the Sea, winner Cologne & Munich Surf Film Festivals, winner Cape Town Wavescape Film Festival. 
additional music for Houston, in competition at Sundance Festival, winner Hofer Filmtage.
Jedes Jahr im Juni.
Sogar die Nacht.
Jerry Goldsmith Awards finalists.
 2012
UNESCO web series Inside the Stones, music by Nine Inch Nails, Gary Marlowe and Moby.
Hollywood Music In Media Awards nomination. 
Jerry Goldsmith Awards 2012 finalist.
 2011   
1949, German predicate of special merit, Nominee Berlin Shortcutz Awards.
Stubbe - Querschläger.
 2010 
personal exhibition requiem | repeat, aural frames installation in Venice.
Jerry Goldsmith Awards 2010 finalist.
 2009 
Heisse Spur.
A Place Called Los Pereyra. 
aural frames installation the forest of st. elena, Venice Art Biennale, Richard Nonas exhibition.
 2008 
Das Echo der Schuldl.
 2007 
Schuld und Unschuld, three Nominations Film&TV Music Awards in Los Angeles.
 2006 
Kunstfehler, Nomination Film&TV Music Awards Los Angeles. 
Celebration Of Flight, winner Gloria Festival; Thin Line Festival, U.S.A., winner Dijon.
 2005 
Lautlos (Soundless), Grand Prix Cognac Film Festival; winner Houston Film Festival, U.S.A.
 2004 
Lautlos.
Styx.
 2001 
Birth:day
 1999 
Framed, Nomination Deutscher Filmpreis Award.
 1998 Fool Moon.
 1995 Für mich soll's rote Rosen regnen (music consultant).
 1987-89 Teenage Mutant Ninja Turtles (TV Series) (title song co-producer).
 1989 Vera und Babs (TV Series) (music performance and actor).Die Didi-Show (TV Series) (ZDF).
 1985  (title song) ... aka A.I.D.S. Trop jeune pour mourir (France).
 1984 The Bear'' (animated film).

Awards and nominations 
He is five times Jerry Goldsmith Awards Finalist (2015, 2014, 2013, 2012, 2010), and was nominee at the Hollywood Music in Media Awards 2012.

 2018: NOMINATION BEST FILM MUSIC, 6th German Documentary Film Music Awards.
      Official acknowledgement as a “STEINWAY ARTIST” by Steinway & Sons.
 2017: “The Milk System”: WINNER 11th International Fünf Seen Film Festival. 
      “When Paul came over the Sea”: WINNER 20th Shanghai International Film Festival.
       NOMINATION BEST FILM MUSIC 38th Filmfestival Max Ophüls Preis, Germany.
 2017: NOMINATION BEST FILM MUSIC 38th Max Ophüls Preis Festival.
 2016: “Schrotten!”: Winner 37th Max Ophüls Preis, Germany.
 2015: “Winnetous Sohn”: Winner 31st Warsaw Film Festival, Poland. 
 “Autumn Tingles: Speed Dating for Silver Hairs”: Winner Grimme Preis, Germany. 
 “Mordsfreunde”: Jerry Goldsmith Awards Finalist, Spain. 
 2014: Jerry Goldsmith Awards Finalist for “The Old, the Young & the Sea”.
 2013: Jerry Goldsmith Awards Finalist for “Sogar die Nacht”. 
 2012: Nomination Hollywood Music In Media Awards as “Best Score Commercial Advertisement”. 
Jerry Goldsmith Awards Finalist as “Best Music for Advertisement”.
 2011: Nomination “Best Original Music”, Berlin Shortcutz Awards, for “1949”.
 2010: Jerry Goldsmith Awards Finalist with “A Place Called Los Pereyra”.
 2007: Four nominations for the Film&TV Music Awards in Los Angeles:
           Best Use of a Song in a Television Program: Gary Marlowe, “Rise” - “Kunstfehler”  
           Best Score for a Dramatic TV Program: Gary Marlowe - “Schuld Und Unschuld”  
           Best Instrumental Performance by an Orchestra: Orchestra Sinfonica di Trieste - “Schuld Und Unschuld” 
           Best Instrumental Performance by a Soloist in a Film Score: Gary Marlowe - “Schuld und Unschuld” 
 
 2006: Celebration of Flight: Winner Gloria Film Fest Utah, U.S.A. Winner Thin Line Film Festival, Texas, U.S.A. Grand Prix Audience Dijon Film Festival, France.
 
 2005: “Lautlos” won the Grand Prix at the 23rd International Film Festival of Cognac, France. 
 Platinum Award at the 38th Houston International Film Festival, U.S.A.
The Berlinale Festival chose Gary Marlowe for the “Berlinale Talent Campus”.
 
 2003: Winner Emma Contestabile Award.
 
 2000: „framed“: Nomination for the Deutscher Filmpreis Award. 
 
 Marlowe had a Europe-wide No.1 hit single and many Top Ten chart entries, as well as international Platinum and Gold Record Awards.

References

audiophil 08/2013
Sound&Recording 09/2013
Gary Marlowe bei n-tv.de (12/2012)

External links
 
   
Gary Marlowe live with The Brussels Philharmonic Orchestra 10/2013 (video)
Gary Marlowe´s music on soundcloud

1967 births
Living people
German composers
Island Records artists